Mountain heather is a common name for several plants in the heather family (Ericaceae) and may refer to:

 Cassiope
 Phyllodoce